Tapinoma opacum is a species of ant in the genus Tapinoma. Described by Wheeler and Mann in 1914, the species is endemic to the Dominican Republic, Haiti and other areas in the Greater Antilles.

References

Tapinoma
Hymenoptera of North America
Insects described in 1914